Chlosyne acastus, the sagebrush checkerspot, is a butterfly of the family Nymphalidae that is found in North America. They range from western United States east to Nebraska and north to southern Alberta.

Description
The adult may be often confused with the northern checkerspot (C. palla) and Hoffmann's checkerspot (C. hoffmanni).

Life cycle
There is one flight that occurs between May to early September in Canada.  The caterpillar of this species feeds on rabbit-brush (Chrysothamnus viscidiflorus) and desert-aster (Machaeranthera species).

Subspecies
C. a. neumoegeni (Skinner, 1895)
C. a. sabina (Wright, 1905)

References

External links
Sagebrush checkerspot, BugGuide

Butterflies of North America
acastus
Taxa named by William Henry Edwards
Butterflies described in 1874